Prunty is the surname of the following people:
Ben Prunty, American composer
Bryan Prunty (born 1983), Scottish football striker
Joe Prunty, American basketball coach 
Melinda Gibbons Prunty (born 1957), American politician
Robert Prunty, American football coach
Wyatt Prunty (born 1947), American poet

See also
Prunty, West Virginia, an unincorporated community in the U.S.